Debra A. Cafaro is an American business executive who has been CEO of Ventas, Inc. since 1999.

Personal life

Cafaro was born in Pittsburgh, Pennsylvania to a working class Catholic family. She has one younger sister. Her mother, Dee Francis, was first-generation Lebanese who grew up in an Arabic speaking household in Washington, Pennsylvania. Her father was born in Pittsburgh to a first-generation Italian family with 13 children. His immigrant father and mother owned restaurants and bars; her father worked as a letter carrier for the US Postal Service. Cafaro married Terrance K. Livingston in 1983. They have two adult children and reside in suburban Chicago.

Education and career

Cafaro received her B.A. in government economics from the University of Notre Dame in 1979 and her J.D. in 1982 from the University of Chicago Law School. During Law School, she was the research assistant for Edward H. Levi,  the former President of the University and Attorney General of the United States. She had summer associate stints at the law firms Jones Day in Cleveland (1980), Debevoise & Plimpton in New York (1981) and Cleary Gottlieb in New York (1982). In 1982–83, Cafaro served as a judicial clerk to the Hon. J. Dickson Phillips, United States Court of Appeals for the Fourth Circuit. From 1983 to 1997, Cafaro practiced real estate, corporate and finance law, Cafaro also taught real estate transactions and finance as an adjunct professor at Northwestern University Law School from 1988 to 1992. She joined Ambassador Apartments Inc. (NYSE:AAH), a multifamily REIT, as president and a director, in 1997 where she helped sell the company.

Cafaro was hired as President and Chief Executive Officer to rescue Ventas, a healthcare REIT, in 1999. Her initial actions at Ventas were to restructure the bank debt, lead a global consensual restructuring of its main tenant Vencor so it could emerge from bankruptcy (renamed Kindred Healthcare, Inc.) Cafaro was listed as one of the best performing CEOs in the world for six years by the Harvard Business Review, until the list was discontinued in 2020.

In 2016, Cafaro became an owner and member of the management committee of the Pittsburgh Penguins, a National Hockey League team, who won back-to-back Stanley Cup championships in 2016 and 2017.

References 

1957 births
Living people
American health care businesspeople
American real estate businesspeople
Businesspeople from Pittsburgh
American people of Italian descent
American people of Lebanese descent
Lawyers from Pittsburgh
People associated with Cleary Gottlieb Steen & Hamilton
American women chief executives
Notre Dame College of Arts and Letters alumni
University of Chicago Law School alumni
Fellows of the American Academy of Arts and Sciences
21st-century American women